USS King can refer to the following ships of the United States Navy:

  was a  during World War II, named for WWI Commander Frank Ragan King
  was a  during the Cold War, named for WWII Fleet Admiral Ernest J. King

United States Navy ship names